Chalermsuk Kaewsuktae (born May 9, 1989), is a professional footballer from Thailand.

Honours

Club

Ubon UMT United
Regional League North-East Division
 Runner-up  : 2015

Buriram United F.C.
 Thai FA Cup
Winners : 2012 
 Thai League Cup
Winners : 2012

External links
 Goal.com 
https://us.soccerway.com/players/chalermsuk-kaewsuktae/303266/

1989 births
Living people
Chalermsuk Kaewsuktae
Chalermsuk Kaewsuktae
Association football central defenders
Chalermsuk Kaewsuktae
Chalermsuk Kaewsuktae
Chalermsuk Kaewsuktae
Chalermsuk Kaewsuktae
Chalermsuk Kaewsuktae
Chalermsuk Kaewsuktae
Chalermsuk Kaewsuktae
Chalermsuk Kaewsuktae